Iowa Highway 96 (Iowa 96) is a state highway which runs from west to east in central Iowa.  It begins at Iowa Highway 14 southwest of Conrad and ends at U.S. Highway 63 east of Gladbrook.

Route description
From Iowa 14, it heads due east for  towards Gladbrook. East of Gladbrook, it continues east, angling slightly to the southeast, for  until it ends at another T-intersection with U.S. Highway 63.

History
In 1926, Highway 59 became U.S. Highway 63. By 1947, the highway had been extended west to Iowa 14. By 1956, the entire route was paved.

Major intersections

References

External links

096